Vogeltown is a hillside suburb of Wellington, New Zealand, on the eastern slopes of Brooklyn and overlooking Newtown. It is sometimes considered part of Mornington.  

In later Maori times parts of the area now occupied by Vogeltown and eastern Brooklyn were used for cultivation by the Te Aro hapu (sub-tribe) of the Te Atiawa, the dominant tribe in the region.  In European times the area became known as the Omaroro cultivation area, and control and ownership remained with Te Aro.  The area primarily used for cultivation were located north of Pearce Street on what is now part of Wellington's Town Belt and this area is a protected site under the Town Belt Management Plan and the Wellington District Plan.

There is no record of alienation of the land from the original owners until 25 March 1859, when the Te Aro people led by Mohi Ngaponga leased the section to one John H E Wright for 14 years at £30 per annum.  At the end of this lease in 1873 Wright purchased the freehold for £700.  This land has since developed into the suburb of Vogeltown.

At the council review of suburb boundaries in the early 21st century, Vogeltown nearly suffered absorption into adjacent suburbs.

The name Vogeltown derives from Sir Julius Vogel, author, entrepreneur, and premier of New Zealand from April 1873 until July 1875. In 1867, Vogel married Mary Clayton, daughter of architect Sir William Clayton, who gifted the couple Finnimore House. This house is still located at the corner of Finnimore Terrace and Dransfield Road, past the top of Hutchison Road in Vogeltown. The estate has been subdivided several times.

Many of the houses built in Vogeltown date from the 1920s.

Demographics
Vogeltown is part of the Kingston-Mornington-Vogeltown statistical area.

The 2013 census population was 2,004 for Vogeltown.

References

External links
 Finnimore House : History
 Maori sites of Te Whanganui a Tara

Suburbs of Wellington City